Tatyana Tischenko (born January 1, 1975) is a Russian sprint canoer who competed in the late 1990s. She won three medals at the ICF Canoe Sprint World Championships with a silver (K-4 200 m: 1999) and two bronzes (K-2 200 m: 1995, K-4 200 m: 1998).

Tischenko also finished seventh in the K-4 500 m event at the 1996 Summer Olympics in Atlanta.

References

Sports-reference.com profile

1975 births
Canoeists at the 1996 Summer Olympics
Living people
Olympic canoeists of Russia
Russian female canoeists
ICF Canoe Sprint World Championships medalists in kayak